Markiani is a Bronze Age fortified settlement built on top of a hill in the island of Amorgos in Greece.

Signs of early Cycladic habitation at Markiani span a period of ten centuries, dating from the Grotta-Pelos culture to the Kastri culture phases (ca. 3200-2200 BC). The site has also been inhabited at latter times during the Hellenistic and Roman periods.

See also
History of the Cyclades
Cycladic art

External links
Μαρκιανή Αμοργού

References

Cycladic civilization
Bronze Age sites in Greece
Archaeological sites on the Aegean Islands
Amorgos